Fishing Point is a suburb of the City of Lake Macquarie in New South Wales, Australia, and is located on the western shore of Lake Macquarie on a peninsula south of Rathmines.

References

External links
 History of Fishing Point (Lake Macquarie City Library)

Suburbs of Lake Macquarie